Fiorella is an Italian female given name. Notable people with the given name include:

Fiorella Aíta (born 1977), Peruvian volleyball player
Fiorella Betti (1927-2001), Italian actress
Fiorella Bonicelli (born 1951), Uruguayan tennis player
Fiorella Chiappe (born 1996), Argentine hurdler
Fiorella Cueva (born 1998), Peruvian weightlifter
Fiorella D'Croz Brusatin (born 1979), Colombian triathlete
Fiorella Faltoyano (born 1949), Spanish actress
Fiorella Ghilardotti (1946–2005), Italian politician and trade unionist 
Fiorella Infascelli (born 1952), Italian film director and screenwriter
Fiorella Kostoris (born 1945), Italian economist 
Fiorella Mannoia (born 1954), Italian singer
Fiorella Mari (born 1928), Brazilian-Italian actress
Fiorella Mattheis (born 1988), Brazilian actress, model and television presenter
Fiorella Migliore (born 1989), Paraguayan model, beauty queen, actress and television presenter
Fiorella Negro (1938-2019), Italian competitive figure skater
Fiorella Pacheco (born 1985), Peruvian footballer
Fiorella Terenzi, Italian author
Fiorella Salazar Rojas, Costa Rican politician
Fiorella Valverde (born 1989), Peruvian footballer
Fiorella Viñas (born c. 1984), Peruvian beauty pageant titleholder

Italian feminine given names
Spanish feminine given names